Henri Bontenbal (born 10 November 1982) is a Dutch energy consultant and politician, who serves as a member of the House of Representatives. He is a member of the Christian Democratic Appeal (CDA).

Before he became a member of parliament, Bontenbal worked in the energy sector and advised the CDA on energy issues. He participated in the 2021 general election and was not elected. In June 2021, he was first appointed to the House as the temporary replacement of Pieter Omtzigt. He became a permanent member of parliament in January 2022 after having also replaced Harry van der Molen during his sick leave.

Early life and education 
Bontenbal was born in Rotterdam as the fourth in a family of eight children and grew up in its southern borough of IJsselmonde (initially in the Lombardijen neighborhood). His father worked as a municipal cartographer in Rotterdam. After completing his secondary education at a gymnasium, he studied physics at Leiden University and became interested in climate change mitigation in the last phase of his studies.

Career 
Bontenbal started his career at sustainability consultancy DWA. In 2011 – after four years at DWA – he took a job as a policy officer for the CDA's caucus in the House of Representatives, focusing on sustainability, energy, and the environment. Bontenbal became an independent consultant specialized in renewable energy generation in 2013 and served at the same time as a junior fellow of the CDA's scientific bureau. In July 2015, he started working as senior strategy consultant at gas and electricity network operator Stedin. Bontenbal was placed 94th on the 2018 edition of the Duurzame 100 (Sustainable 100), a yearly list published by newspaper Trouw with the one hundred most influential Dutch people in sustainability. He had before criticized the list, calling it elitist and lacking of people who contribute behind the scenes.

While working for Stedin, he frequently wrote op-eds and commented on energy policy in the media. He also recorded a 36-episode podcast series with energy researcher Remco de Boer in the years 2018–20 about the subject called Bontenbal & de Boer. Bontenbal has supported an energy transition away from natural gas and has called it necessary to consider biomass and nuclear power for achieving climate goals. He has also decried political parties that have solely blamed corporations for climate change. In 2019, when the third Rutte cabinet was struggling with reactive nitrogen emissions, Bontenbal told Trouw that the CDA would not have a future if it would keep advertising itself as a party for the countryside. He explained that farmers, while important, are just one group of people, and that the CDA should have a story that resonates with the whole of society.

House of Representatives 
Bontenbal was the CDA's seventeenth candidate in the 2021 general election. He received 1,345 preference votes, and he was not elected, because the CDA won fifteen seats in the House of Representatives. Bontenbal was appointed to the House on 1 June 2021 as the temporary replacement of Pieter Omtzigt, who went on sick leave. He simultaneously left Stedin. His focus in the House is on climate, energy, and digital affairs (formerly also sustainable transport), and he is on the Committees for Digital Affairs, for Economic Affairs and Climate Policy, and for Finance. Omtzigt returned to the House of Representatives from his leave on 15 September, bringing an end to Bontenbal's term. However, Bontenbal was again sworn into the House on 29 September. Joba van den Berg, who was temporarily replacing Harry van der Molen during his sick leave, became a permanent member of the body following Mona Keijzer's resignation. This caused a vacancy for Van der Molen's seat until his planned return on 28 December, which was filled by Bontenbal. After a short period without House membership, Bontenbal was sworn in for a third time – this time as a permanent House member – on 18 January 2022 as the replacement of Wopke Hoekstra, who had joined the new fourth Rutte cabinet.

Bontenbal and the CDA's scientific institute presented their climate vision in September 2021. It called for a green industrial policy and for talks with major polluters to make binding agreements about reducing emissions. The document also advocated government investments in infrastructure for the hydrogen economy. That same month, he said that it might be necessary for the government to buy Tata Steel's blast furnace in IJmuiden either partly or in its entirety in order to make it more sustainable. Bontenbal suggested in early 2022 to build small modular reactors to reduce dependency on fossil fuels, calling it a promising development. Furthermore, following a call by the Consumentenbond, Bontenbal filed a motion to force the government to investigate a potential ban on loot boxes – purchases of randomized prizes in video games – out of a concern for gambling addiction among children. It was carried by the House in July 2022. While global energy prices were steeply increasing, Bontenbal and Silvio Erkens (VVD) proposed five measures to relieve consumers to Minister for Climate and Energy Policy Rob Jetten in October 2022. Their recommendations included mandating energy suppliers to offer fixed contracts, forbidding them to give discounts to new customers, and subjecting them to a yearly stress test as well as strengthening consumer protections in case of bankruptcy. The CDA and VVD had liberalized the energy market as part of the second Balkenende cabinet.

In the 2022 municipal elections, he was one of the CDA's  in Rotterdam.

Personal life 
Bontenbal has lived in the southern part of Rotterdam his entire life, and he has a wife, who works as a midwife. They got married in 2006, and they have two sons. Bontenbal can play the piano and the saxophone, and he is a fan of Russian composer and pianist Sergei Rachmaninoff.

Bontenbal was raised as a member of the Reformed Congregations but decided to move to the Dutch Reformed Church during adolescence. He is a descendant of Claes Michielsz Bontenbal (1575–1623), who was beheaded for his role in a conspiracy against Maurice, Prince of Orange.

References 

1982 births
21st-century Dutch politicians
Christian Democratic Appeal politicians
Dutch consultants
Leiden University alumni
Living people
Members of the House of Representatives (Netherlands)
People associated with renewable energy
Political staffers
Politicians from Rotterdam